Vinod Shantilal Adani is a Dubai-based Indian billionaire businessman. In late 2022, as per Hurun India Rich List, he was described as the richest non-resident Indian, and the sixth-richest Indian overall, with a fortune of ₹169,000 crore (US $20.42 billion). He is the older brother of the Indian billionaire Gautam Adani.

Adani has been a resident of Dubai since 1994. He has managed trading businesses in Dubai, Jakarta and Singapore.

In 2021, India Today named him as being listed in the Panama Papers. In 2023, Hindenburg Research published a report critical of his business dealings.

References 

Living people
21st-century Indian Jains
Vinod
Adani Group
Businesspeople from Ahmedabad
Indian billionaires
Indian businesspeople
Indian commodities traders
Gujarati people
Year of birth missing (living people)